Bythaelurus bachi, commonly known as Bach's catshark, is a species of catshark found in southern Madagascar Ridge in the southwestern Indian Ocean.

Compared to all of its congeners in Western Indian Ocean, Bach's catshark has higher diversity of dermal denticle morphology in general, lighter body coloration, and the presence of numerous partially composite papillae on its tongue and palate (the roof of a mouth).

References 

Bythaelurus
Fish described in 2016